Watergall is a civil parish near Southam, Warwickshire, England. It lies in the Stratford-on-Avon District.

History 
Watergall was an extra-parochial area until 1858, when it became a civil parish. Watergall is probably a medieval shrunken village and contains no current settlements.

References 

Civil parishes in Warwickshire
Stratford-on-Avon District